The Serorome River is a river in the Central District of Botswana, a tributary of the Limpopo River.

Geology

At one time the western Kalahari Region was a large, shallow inland lake, draining into the Limpopo through the Serorome Valley.
Later geological upheavals re-oriented the rivers in the region to mainly flow northeast into the Zambezi.
The Serorome valley is the exception, still leading to the Limpopo via a rift fault.

Climate

Today the river flows through relatively flat, semi-arid country with savannah grasslands, shrubs and trees. 
The river flows occasionally in the rainy season, which  lasts from November to April, and for the remainder of the year it is dry. 
It flows below its confluence with the Bonwapitse River due to run off in the Bonwapitse catchment.
David Livingstone visited the region in 1857, and described the Serorome as "... a lovely spot in the otherwise dry region. The wells from which we had to lift out water for our cattle are deep, but they were well filled."

Economic activity

The Mmamabula coal field lies to the south of the river.

References
Citations

Sources

Rivers of Botswana